Rodnie Jerome Graham, Jr. (born October 15, 1981), who goes by the stage name Swift but formerly R-Swift, is an American Christian hip hop musician. His first album Elevation 81.02 was released in 2003, with I-66 Entertainment, the second album Revolutionary Theme Muzik was released with Cross Movement Records in 2007. In 2008, he released, his third album, Soapbox, that was his first album to debut on the Billboard Top Gospel Albums charts. His fourth album would do likewise, which was released in 2009, Anthem, also with Cross Movement. The fifth album, Apply Pressure, with Rhyme Council and Central South, was released in 2013, and this got on the aforementioned chart, as well as, Christian Albums. He is now signed to Xist.

Early life
R-Swift was born on October 15, 1981 as Rodnie Jerome Graham, Jr. in Long Island, New York, who moved to Philadelphia, Pennsylvania as a youngster and young adult.

Personal life
R-Swift is married to Stacey, who is a cancer survivor, and together they now reside in Atlanta, Georgia. They have three daughters, who are Shayla, Jasmine, and Summer. Their only son died, who was Rodnie Jerome Graham, III, in 2009.

Music career
His first album Elevation 81.02 was released in 2003, with I-66 Entertainment, the second album Revolutionary Theme Muzik was released with Cross Movement Records on June 19, 2007. On June 10, 2008, he released, his third album, Soapbox, that was his first album to debut on the Billboard Top Gospel Albums charts at No. 20. His fourth album would do likewise at No. 22, which was released on October 6, 2009, Anthem, also with Cross Movement. The fifth album, Apply Pressure, with Rhyme Council and Central South, was released on June 11, 2013, and this got on the aforementioned chart at No. 21, as well as, Christian Albums at No. 46. He is presently signed to Xist Music.

Discography

Studio albums

References

1981 births
Living people
African-American rappers
African-American Christians
Musicians from Pennsylvania
Performers of Christian hip hop music
Rappers from New York (state)
Rappers from Philadelphia
21st-century American rappers
21st-century African-American musicians
20th-century African-American people